The following is a list of notable deaths in March 2022.

Entries for each day are listed alphabetically by surname. A typical entry lists information in the following sequence:
 Name, age, country of citizenship at birth, subsequent country of citizenship (if applicable), reason for notability, cause of death (if known), and reference.

March 2022

1
Brahim Boutaleb, 84, Moroccan academic and politician, deputy (1977–1983).
Yvonne Ciannella, 95, American coloratura soprano.
Clement Crisp, 95, British dance critic (Financial Times).
George DeLeone, 73, American football coach (Southern Connecticut Owls), cancer.
Jim Denomie, 67, American Ojibwe painter, cancer.
Conrad Janis, 94, American musician and actor (Mork & Mindy, Margie, That Hagen Girl), organ failure.
Gordon Kannegiesser, 76, Canadian ice hockey player (St. Louis Blues, Houston Aeros, Indianapolis Racers), complications from amyotrophic lateral sclerosis.
Herbert Kelman, 94, American social psychologist.
Alevtina Kolchina, 91, Russian cross-country skier, Olympic champion (1964).
Kendrew Lascelles, 86, English-born South African actor (Candy Stripe Nurses).
Warner Mack, 86, American country singer-songwriter ("Is It Wrong (For Loving You)", "The Bridge Washed Out").
Alfred Mayer, 85, Austrian politician.
Katie Meyer, 22, American soccer player (Stanford Cardinal), NCAA champion (2019), suicide.
Noni Olabisi, 67, American painter and muralist.
Hugh O'Shaughnessy, 87, British journalist and writer.
Richard E. Rumble, 99, American rear admiral.
Amnon Shamosh, 93, Israeli writer and poet.
Wang Bei, 90, Chinese actress (Crows and Sparrows, The Life of Wu Xun).
Bob Wellings, 87, British television presenter and journalist (Nationwide).

2
Israel Beltrán Montes, 74, Mexican politician, deputy (1991–1994, 2006–2009), complications from COVID-19.
Johnny Brown, 84, American actor (Good Times, Rowan & Martin's Laugh-In, The Plastic Man Comedy/Adventure Show) and singer.
Yosef Carmon, 88, Israeli actor (Alila, Sweet Mud) and stage director.
Robert Cohen, 91, French boxer, world bantamweight champion (1954).
Olivier Cousi, 62, French lawyer, bâtonnier of the Paris Bar Association (since 2020).
John S. Crosby, 89, American lieutenant general.
Evérard Daigle, 96, Canadian politician, New Brunswick MLA (1974–1987).
Cathy Daley, 66, Canadian visual artist and educator.
Kenneth Duberstein, 77, American lobbyist, White House chief of staff (1988–1989).
Eberhard Goldhahn, 94, German politician, MP (1990).
Roger Graef, 85, American-born British documentary filmmaker, cancer.
William Jolitz, 65, American software programmer, developer of the 386BSD operating system, sarcoma.
Milton Klein, 98, American nuclear engineer.
Oleksandr Korpan, 27, Ukrainian military pilot, shot down.
Alan Ladd Jr., 84, American film producer (Braveheart, Gone Baby Gone) and studio executive (20th Century Fox), Oscar winner (1996), kidney failure.
Autherine Lucy, 92, American civil rights activist.
Chris Madden, 73, American interior designer and television host, head injuries sustained in a fall.
Moussa Okanla, 71, Beninese scholar and diplomat, minister of foreign affairs (2007–2008).
Shane Olivea, 40, American football player (San Diego Chargers), heart disease.
Keith Ortego, 58, American football player (Chicago Bears).
Jean-Pierre Pernaut, 71, French news reader and broadcaster, lung cancer.
Robert John Rose, 92, American Roman Catholic prelate, bishop of Gaylord (1981–1989) and Grand Rapids (1989–2003).
John Stahl, 68, Scottish actor (Game of Thrones, Victoria & Abdul, Take the High Road), cancer.
Volodymyr Struk, 57, Ukrainian politician, deputy (2012–2014) and mayor of Kreminna (since 2020), shot.
Frédérick Tristan, 90, French writer and poet.
Tony Walton, 87, British set and costume designer (Pippin, All That Jazz, Mary Poppins), Oscar and Tony winner, complications from a stroke.

3
Josef Bauer, 88, Austrian artist.
Şenol Birol, 86, Turkish football player (Beşiktaş, Fenerbahçe, national team) and manager.
Yuan-Shih Chow, 97, Chinese-American probabilist.
Valeriy Chybineyev, 34, Ukrainian army major, killed in battle.
Frank Connor, 86, Scottish football player (St Mirren, Albion Rovers) and manager (Raith Rovers).
Tim Considine, 81, American actor (My Three Sons, The Mickey Mouse Club, Patton).
Angela Crow, 86, British actress (Coronation Street, Grange Hill, Barney Is My Darling).
Andrea Danyluk, 59, American computer scientist, pancreatic cancer.
John Duffy, 58, Canadian political strategist and writer.
Yona Fischer, 89, Israeli art curator.
Francesca Gargallo, 65, Italian-born Mexican philosopher, cancer.
Sir Charles Gray, 79, British barrister and judge.
Thomas B. Hayward, 97, American Navy admiral, chief of naval operations (1978–1982).
Bruce Johnstone, 85, South African racing driver.
Terrence Kaufman, 84, American linguist.
Le Havre, 16, Irish-born racehorse and sire.
Oddvar J. Majala, 89, Norwegian politician, MP (1981–1989).
Walter Mears, 87, American journalist (Associated Press), Pulitzer Prize winner (1977), cancer.
Abune Merkorios, 83, Ethiopian Orthodox prelate, patriarch of the Ethiopian Orthodox Tewahedo Church (1988–1991, since 2018).
Jun Misawa, 69, Japanese baseball player and politician, member of the House of Representatives (1996–2000).
Denroy Morgan, 76, Jamaican-born American reggae musician, cancer.
Kyotaro Nishimura, 91, Japanese author, liver cancer.
Albert Pobor, 65, Croatian football manager (Hrvatski Dragovoljac, Vrbovec, Brežice 1919).
Clément Richard, 83, Canadian lawyer, businessman, and politician, Quebec MNA (1976–1985).
Luiz Pinguelli Rosa, 80, Brazilian nuclear physicist.
William Samb, Papua New Guinean politician, MP (since 2015).
Bruno Saul, 90, Estonian politician.
Otto Schweizer, 97, German footballer (Bayern Munich).
Heinz Wassermann, 82, German footballer (Rot-Weiss Essen, Mainz 05).
Maryan Wisniewski, 85, French footballer (Lens, Sochaux, national team).
Dean Woods, 55, Australian cyclist, Olympic champion (1984).
Indra Yasin, 67, Indonesian politician, regent of North Gorontalo (since 2012).
Rich Yonakor, 63, American basketball player (San Antonio Spurs).

4
Guido Anzile, 93, Italian-born French road racing cyclist.
Anne Beaumanoir, 98, French neurophysiologist, Resistance member during World War II, Righteous Among the Nations (1996).
Ruth Bidgood, 99, Welsh poet.
Willy Buer, 93, Norwegian footballer (Odd, Lyn, national team).
Terry Cooney, 88, American baseball umpire (MLB).
Iwan Edwards, 84, British-born Canadian choral conductor.
Robert Faricy, 95, American Jesuit priest and theologian.
Joel Gerber, 81, American judge.
Miguel Grinberg, 84, Argentine writer, poet, and journalist.
Jean-Guy Guilbault, 90, Canadian politician, MP (1984–1993).
Jimbeau Hinson, 70, American country music singer-songwriter.
Wilhelm Huberts, 84, Austrian football player (Grazer AK, Eintracht Frankfurt, national team) and manager.
Dai Jones, 78, Welsh television presenter (Cefn Gwlad).
Elsa Klensch, 92, Australian-born American journalist and television presenter (Style with Elsa Klensch).
Valentin Knysh, 84, Russian politician, deputy (1995–2003).
Juan Pablo de Laiglesia, 73, Spanish diplomat, state secretary for international cooperation (2018–2020) and president of AECID (2018–2020).
Colin Lewis, 79, British Olympic racing cyclist (1964), cancer.
Stewart Lord, 81, Australian footballer (Geelong).
Peter Marcuse, 93, German-American lawyer and urban planner.
Paula Marosi, 85, Hungarian fencer, Olympic champion (1964).
Rod Marsh, 74, Australian Hall of Fame cricket player (Western Australia, national team) and coach, heart attack.
Keven McKenna, 77, American politician, member of the Rhode Island House of Representatives (1979–1985) and president of the Rhode Island Constitutional Convention (1985–1986).
Juan Carlos Muñiz, 37, Mexican journalist, shot.
Bill Phipps, 79, Canadian religious leader, moderator of the United Church of Canada (1997–2000).
James Remnant, 3rd Baron Remnant, 91, British hereditary peer, member of the House of Lords (1967–1999).
Sunith Francis Rodrigues, 88, Indian military officer, chief of the army staff (1990–1993), chairman of COSC (1991–1993) and governor of Punjab (2004–2010).
Mitchell Ryan, 88, American actor (Dark Shadows, Dharma & Greg, Lethal Weapon), heart failure.
Paul Shefflin, 41, Irish hurler (Ballyhale Shamrocks).
Karl Swan, 90, American politician, member of the Utah State Senate (1971–1991).
George Walker, 78, British educator.
Shane Warne, 52, Australian Hall of Fame cricketer (Victoria, Hampshire, national team), delivered the Ball of the Century, heart attack.

5
Masood Akhtar, 81, Pakistani actor (Shabana, Watan Kay Rakhwalay, Moosa Khan), lung cancer.
Lynda Baron, 82, British actress (Open All Hours, Come Outside, EastEnders).
Elguja Burduli, 80, Georgian actor (Dark Eyes, The Sun of the Sleepless, A Chef in Love) and singer.
Agostino Cacciavillan, 95, Italian Roman Catholic cardinal, president of the Administration of the Patrimony of the Apostolic See (1998–2002).
Dennis Cunningham, 86, American civil rights lawyer.
Luz Fernandez, 86, Filipino actress (Feng Shui, The Ghost Bride, Mang Kepweng Returns) and television presenter, cardiac arrest.
Takashi Hikino, 71, Japanese economist.
Adrienne L. Kaeppler, 86, American anthropologist and author.
Lil Bo Weep, 22, Australian rapper and singer.
Antonio Martino, 79, Italian politician, deputy (1994–2018), minister of foreign affairs (1994–1995) and defence (2001–2006).
Gladys Moisés, 60, Argentine lawyer and politician, cancer.
Immanuel Ngatjizeko, 69, Namibian politician, MP (since 2000).
Patricio Renán, 77, Chilean singer.
Roberto Rivas Reyes, 67, Nicaraguan magistrate, president of the Supreme Electoral Council (2000–2018), sepsis and COVID-19.
Sally Schmitt, 90, American restaurateur, founder of The French Laundry.
Taro Shigaki, 70, Japanese actor, heart failure (Shin Heike Monogatari, Hans Christian Andersen's The Little Mermaid, Swan Lake).
Nils Dag Strømme, 76, Norwegian Olympic boxer (1968, 1972).
James W. Truran, 81, American physicist.
Colin Wesley, 84, South African cricketer (national team), complications from a stroke.
Roy Winston, 81, American football player (Minnesota Vikings).
Zhang Zhongxian, 96, Chinese military officer, political commissar of Guangzhou Military Region (1985–1992).
Vladimir Zhoga, 28, Ukrainian Sparta Battalion commander, killed in battle.

6
Ahmad Muhammad Al-Khatib, 95, Kuwaiti doctor and politician, MP (1963–1965, 1971–1976, 1985–1996).
Robbie Brightwell, 82, British sprinter, Olympic silver medalist (1964).
Bhim Prasad Dahal, 67, Indian politician, MP (1996–2004), renal failure.
Alan R. Drengson, 87–88, Canadian philosopher.
Hubert Fattal, 51, Lebanese businessman and perfumer, stabbed.
Frank Fleming, 68, American politician, member of the Montana House of Representatives (since 2018).
Jean-Antoine Fiori, 39, French rally driver, racing accident.
Kjell Grengmark, 87, Swedish curler.
Berty Gunathilake, 97, Sri Lankan actor (Cheriyo Captain, Somy Boys, Vala In London) and comedian.
Kenneth Ives, 87, British actor (Doctor Who) and director (Poldark, Secret Army).
June Kirby, 94, American actress (Kismet, Guys and Dolls) and model.
Margit Korondi, 89, Hungarian gymnast, Olympic champion (1952, 1956).
Luc Laventure, 77, French journalist, director of France Ô and La Première.
Pavlo Lee, 33, Ukrainian actor and television presenter, bombing.
Mao Yongze, 91, Chinese nuclear engineer, member of the Chinese Academy of Engineering.
Geraldo Melo, 86, Brazilian businessman and politician, senator (1995–2003), governor of Rio Grande do Norte (1987–1991), lung cancer.
Frank O'Farrell, 94, Irish football player (West Ham, national team) and manager (Manchester United).
John Parlett, 96, British Olympic runner (1948).
Andrew Reddy, 89, Irish Olympic boxer (1952, 1960).
Pau Riba i Romeva, 73, Spanish musician, pancreatic cancer.
Sayed Hyderali Shihab Thangal, 74, Indian Islamic scholar, cancer.
Giuseppe Wilson, 76, Italian footballer (Internapoli, Lazio, national team), stroke.

7
Paul Anderson, 87, British sailor, Olympic bronze medalist (1968).
Per Magnar Arnstad, 84, Norwegian politician and entrepreneur.
Vasily Astafyev, 102, Russian Soviet army colonel.
Ramón Báez Romano, 93, Dominican golfer and politician.
George Boscawen, 9th Viscount Falmouth, 102, British peer, member of the House of Lords (1962–1999).
Berkrerk Chartvanchai, 77, Thai boxer, WBA flyweight champion (1970).
Sir Jeremy Child, 3rd Baronet, 77, British actor (Privilege, The Stud, Darkest Hour).
Renny Cushing, 69, American politician, four-time member of the New Hampshire House of Representatives, prostate cancer complicated by COVID-19.
José Ricardo Díaz Pardeiro, 77, Spanish historian.
John F. Dunlap, 99, American politician, member of the California State Assembly (1967–1974) and senate (1974–1978).
Avraham Hirschson, 81, Israeli politician, MK (1983–1984, 1992–2009), minister of finance (2006–2007).
István T. Horváth, 68, Hungarian American chemist.
Mia Ikumi, 42, Japanese manga artist (Tokyo Mew Mew, Super Doll Licca-chan), subarachnoid hemorrhage.
Charles Mansolillo, 72, American lawyer and politician, member of the Rhode Island House of Representatives (1973–1975).
Oleksandr Marchenko, 57, Ukrainian politician, deputy (2014–2019), killed in battle.
Geoffrey Thorndike Martin, 87, British Egyptologist.
Jean Mouchel, 93, French politician, MEP (1982–1983, 1984–1989).
*Nadungamuwa Raja, 69, Sri Lankan elephant, heart attack.
Christy O'Brien, 88, Irish hurler (Borris-in-Ossory, Laois).
Benjamín Prado Casas, 96, Chilean politician, senator (1965–1973).
Yuriy Prylypko, 61, Ukrainian politician, mayor of Hostomel (since 2015), shot.
Sumy Sadurni, 32, Chilean photojournalist, traffic collision.
Donna Scheeder, 74, American librarian, president of IFLA (2015–2017), cancer.
Shahnawaz Tanai, 72, Afghan military officer and politician, minister of defence (1988–1990) and chief of the general staff (1988–1990).
Muhammad Rafiq Tarar, 92, Pakistani jurist and politician, president (1998–2001), senator (1997–1998) and justice of the Supreme Court (1991–1994), heart attack.
Teng Jinxian, 84, Chinese film director, producer, and screenwriter.
Héctor Vargas Bastidas, 70, Chilean Roman Catholic prelate, bishop of Arica (2003–2013) and Temuco (since 2013).
Jan Welmers, 84, Dutch composer and organist.
Jesús Zúñiga, 74, Mexican politician, mayor of Unión de Tula (1987–1988), deputy (2015–2018) and member of the Congress of Jalisco (2018–2021), shot.

8
Nelson W. Aldrich Jr., 86, American author.
Joseph R. Bowen, 71, American politician, member of the Kentucky Senate (2011–2019), heart attack.
Tomás Boy, 70, Mexican footballer (Tigres UANL, Atlético Español, national team), pulmonary embolism.
Desislav Chukolov, 47, Bulgarian politician, MEP (2007–2009).
René Clemencic, 94, Austrian composer.
Patrick Duggan, 86, Irish actor (Deathstalker).
Margaret Farrow, 87, American politician, member of the Wisconsin State Assembly (1986–1989) and Senate (1989–2001), lieutenant governor of Wisconsin (2001–2003).
Go for Gin, 30, American racehorse, Kentucky Derby winner (1994), heart failure.
Grandpa Elliott, 77, American musician, complications from skin infection.
Johnny Grier, 74, American football official (NFL).
Ad Havermans, 87, Dutch politician, mayor of The Hague (1985–1996).
Ghanam Al-Jumhur, 90–91, Kuwaiti politician, MP (1963–1999).
Gordon Lee, 87, English football player (Aston Villa) and manager (Newcastle United, Everton).
Fernando Carlos Maletti, 72, Argentine Roman Catholic prelate, bishop of San Carlos de Barlioche (2001–2013) and Merlo–Moreno (since 2013).
Sergei Mandreko, 50, Russian-Tajik football player (Rapid Wien, VfL Bochum, Russia national team) and manager, complications from amyotrophic lateral sclerosis.
Leo Marx, 102, American historian.
Georges Michel, 75, French rugby union player (Tarbes Stadoceste).
Ron Miles, 58, American jazz musician, complications from polycythemia vera.
Mun Jong-nam, North Korean diplomat, ambassador to Italy (2017) and Syria (since 2018), stroke.
Gyo Obata, 99, American architect.
Ron Pember, 87, British actor (Secret Army, Oh! What a Lovely War, Murder by Decree), stage director, and dramatist.
Luiz Pereira, 60, Brazilian shot putter, Paralympic champion (1992).
Valeriy Petrov, 67, Ukrainian football player (Atlantyka Sevastopol, Tavriya Simferopol) and manager, COVID-19.
Jim Richards, 75, American football player (New York Jets).
Volodymyr Rohovsky, 68, Ukrainian footballer (Lokomotyv Kherson, Shakhtar Donetsk, national team). (death announced on this date)
Maria Simon, 103, Austrian sociologist.
Peter Smithwick, 85, Irish judge (Smithwick Tribunal).
Sargur Srihari, 72, Indian-American scientist, complications from glioblastoma.
Ron Stander, 77, American boxer, complications from diabetes.
Kateryna Stupnytska, 25, Ukrainian military officer, missile attack.
Isao Suzuki, 89, Japanese jazz double-bassist, COVID-19.
Oleh Svynchuk, 29, Ukrainian soldier, missile attack.
Serhiy Vasich, 50–51, Ukrainian soldier, missile attack.
Dominique Warluzel, 64, French-born Swiss lawyer and playwright.
Yuriko, 102, American dancer and choreographer.
Eddy Yusuf, 66, Indonesian politician, regent of Ogan Komering Ulu (2003–2008).

9
Aijaz Ahmad, 81, Indian-born American Marxist philosopher.
David Ash, 78, English cricketer (Yorkshire, Cumberland).
Annerose Baier, 75, German ice dancer.
Benjamin Chaha, 82, Nigerian politician.
Justice Christopher, 40, Nigerian footballer (Antwerp, Trelleborg, national team).
David Crooks, 90, New Zealand air force officer, chief of the air staff (1983–1986), chief of defence staff (1986–1987).
Inge Deutschkron, 99, German-Israeli journalist and author.
Joe D'Orazio, 99, British professional wrestler.
Ron Hansen, 78, Canadian politician, Ontario MPP (1990–1995).
Hilman Hariwijaya, 57, Indonesian writer.
Serhiy Kotenko, 54, Ukrainian military officer, shot.
John Korty, 85, American film director (The Autobiography of Miss Jane Pittman, Who Are the DeBolts? And Where Did They Get Nineteen Kids?) and animator.
Jimmy Lydon, 98, American actor (Twice Blessed, Life with Father, The First Hundred Years).
Burton L. Mack, 90, American biblical scholar.
Robert McLendon, 85, American politician, member of the Arizona House of Representatives (1983–2001).
Yves Michalon, 77, French communicator, writer, and publisher.
Donald Pinkel, 95, American pediatrician, director of St. Jude Children's Research Hospital (1962–1973).
Richard Podolor, 86, American musician (The Pets) and record producer (Steppenwolf, Three Dog Night).
Marvin J. Roshell, 89, American politician, member of the Wisconsin Senate (1979–1992).
Vladislav Shoot, 81, Russian-British composer.
Bernard Talon, 91, French politician, senator (1971–1980).
Louis Weil, 86, American Episcopal priest and liturgical scholar.
David Wheeler, 72, American politician, member of the Alabama House of Representatives (since 2018).

10
Robert Cardenas, 102, Mexican-born American air force brigadier general.
Sorapong Chatree, 71, Thai actor (Out of the Darkness, Plae Kao, The Legend of Suriyothai), lung cancer.
Emilio Delgado, 81, American actor (Sesame Street, I Will Fight No More Forever, A Case of You), multiple myeloma.
Sir John Elliott, 91, British historian and Hispanist, pneumonia.
Vladimir Frolov, 54–55, Russian major general.
León Genuth, 90, Argentine Olympic wrestler (1952).
Mario Gigante, 98, American mobster (Genovese crime family).
Georges Ginoux, 88, Belgian-born French politician, senator (2004–2005).
Gerry Goyer, 85, Canadian ice hockey player (Chicago Blackhawks).
Jürgen Grabowski, 77, German footballer (Eintracht Frankfurt, West Germany national team).
Ian Hannaford, 82, Australian footballer (Port Adelaide, South Australia).
Kimberley Kitching, 52, Australian politician, senator (since 2016).
Dimitris Kontominas, 82, Greek businessman.
Magne Landrø, 84, Norwegian Olympic sport shooter (1960, 1964).
Hiram Maristany, 76, American photographer.
Gavin Martin, 60, Northern Irish music journalist.
Bobbie Nelson, 91, American pianist and singer.
Odalis Pérez, 44, Dominican baseball player (Atlanta Braves, Los Angeles Dodgers, Kansas City Royals), fall.
Alvard Petrossyan, 75, Armenian writer, philologist and publicist.
Annerose Schmidt, 85, German classical pianist.
Mario Terán, 79, Bolivian military warrant officer, executioner of Che Guevara.

11
Rupiah Banda, 85, Zambian politician, president (2008–2011) and vice-president (2006–2008), colon cancer.
Mohammed Saeed Bekheitan, 77, Syrian politician.
Sandra Cavalcanti, 96, Brazilian politician, linguist and academic, deputy (1987–1995).
Guayo Cedeño, 48, Honduran musician and record producer, respiratory failure.
Frank De Coninck, 77, Belgian diplomat, ambassador to the Holy See (2006–2010).
Sir William Fittall, 68, British civil servant, secretary general of the Archbishops' Council (2002–2015).
Paul Genevay, 83, French sprinter, Olympic bronze medalist (1964).
Giovanni Giuliano, 72, Italian politician, president of the Province of Imperia (2001–2010).
Norman K. Gottwald, 95, American political activist and biblical scholar.
Rustam Ibragimbekov, 83, Azerbaijani screenwriter (White Sun of the Desert, Burnt by the Sun, The Barber of Siberia), film director and producer.
Andrei Kolesnikov, 45, Russian major general, killed in action.
Jun Kondō, 92, Japanese theoretical physicist (Kondo effect), pneumonia.
Jacobus Luna, 80, Indonesian politician, regent of Bengkayang (2000–2010).
Brad Martin, 48, American country singer ("Before I Knew Better"), cirrhosis.
Michelle Materre, 67, American film distributor and educator.
Gerardo Rozín, 51, Argentinian journalist and television host (Telefe).
João Evangelista Martins Terra, 97, Brazilian Roman Catholic prelate, auxiliary bishop of Brasília (1994–2004).
Timmy Thomas, 77, American R&B singer-songwriter ("Why Can't We Live Together") and musician.
Laurent Vimont, 61, French businessman.
Martha Vonk-van Kalker, 78, Dutch politician, senator (1977–1981).
Nebojša Vučićević, 59, Serbian football player (OFK Beograd, Partizan) and manager (Hajduk Kula).
Cora Faith Walker, 37, American politician, member of the Missouri House of Representatives (2017–2019), non-ischemic cardiomyopathy.
Sally Watson, 98, American author.

12
Dmytro Apukhtin, 44, Ukrainian soldier, shot.
Traci Braxton, 50, American R&B singer (The Braxtons) and television personality (Braxton Family Values), esophageal cancer.
David Jarrett Collins, 86, American inventor and businessman.
Vatsala Deshmukh, 92, Indian actress (Toofan Aur Deeya, Ladki Sahyadri Ki, Jal Bin Machhli Nritya Bin Bijli).
Vera Gissing, 93, Czech-British author and translator.
Eliezer Goldberg, 90, Israeli jurist, judge of the Supreme Court (1983–1998) and state comptroller (1998–2005).
Henry Herscovici, 95, Israeli Olympic sports shooter (1968, 1972).
Valeriy Hudz, 51, Ukrainian military officer.
Dragoljub Jeremić, 43, Serbian footballer (Partizan, Radnički Kragujevac, Bežanija).
Kandikonda, 48, Indian lyricist (Itlu Sravani Subramanyam, Idiot, Satyam), throat cancer.
Pentti Karvonen, 90, Finnish Olympic steeplechase runner (1960).
Alain Krivine, 80, French politician, MEP (1999–2004).
Fujiya Matsumoto, 89, Japanese Olympic sailor (1964).
Marshall W. Moore, 92, American politician, member of the North Dakota House of Representatives (1981–1987).
Robert Vincent O'Neil, 91, American screenwriter, film director (Wonder Women, Angel, Avenging Angel) and producer.
Karl Offmann, 81, Mauritian politician, president (2002–2003).
George Pease, 4th Baron Gainford, 95, British architect and nobleman.
Chris Pfeiffer, 51, German stunt rider, suicide.
Biagio Proietti, 81, Italian screenwriter (La morte risale a ieri sera, The Killer Reserved Nine Seats, The Black Cat) and film director.
Selwyn Ryan, 86, Trinidad and Tobago political scientist.
Günther Schwarz, 80, German politician, member of the Landtag of Saarland (1975–1990).
Pete St John, 90, Irish folk singer-songwriter ("The Fields of Athenry", "The Rare Ould Times").
Av Westin, 92, American television producer (CBS Morning News).
Jessica Williams, 73, American jazz pianist and composer.

13
Quinn H. Becker, 91, American army lieutenant general.
Erhard Busek, 80, Austrian politician, vice-chancellor (1991–1995).
Chiang Chen, 98, Hong Kong industrialist, founder and chairman (1958–2018) of Chen Hsong.
Vic Elford, 86, British racing driver, cancer.
Gary Gresdal, 75, Canadian ice hockey player (Quebec Nordiques).
Paul Hampshire, 40, Scottish footballer (Raith Rovers, Berwick Rangers, East Fife), traffic collision.
Anissa Hassouna, 69, Egyptian politician, MP (2016–2020), cancer.
Leif Hermann, 80, Danish politician, MP (1984–1990).
Maureen Howard, 91, American novelist, memoirist, and editor.
William Hurt, 71, American actor (Kiss of the Spider Woman, Broadcast News, The Incredible Hulk), Oscar winner (1986), prostate cancer.
Ajdar Ismailov, 83, Azerbaijani philologist, co-founder of New Azerbaijan Party.
Harue Kitamura, 93, Japanese politician, mayor of Ashiya, Hyōgo (1991–2003), aspiration pneumonia.
Albert Kresch, 99, American painter.
Pawel Kwiek, 70, Polish photographer.
Mary Lee, 100, Scottish singer and comedian.
Li Guangxi, 92, Chinese operatic tenor, stroke.
Igor Mandić, 82, Croatian writer, literary critic, and columnist.
Sam Massell, 94, American businessman and politician, mayor of Atlanta (1970–1974).
Peter McMahon, 90, Australian politician, member of the New South Wales Legislative Council (1973–1981).
Micaela, Countess of Paris, 83, Chilean-Spanish aristocrat.
Christopher Moore, 70, American preservationist, complications from COVID-19 and pneumonia.
Antonio Nachura, 80, Filipino jurist, associate justice of the Supreme Court (2007–2011), solicitor general (2006–2007) and deputy (1998–2004).
Bernard Nussbaum, 84, American attorney, White House Counsel (1993–1994).
Adam Odzimek, 77, Polish Roman Catholic prelate, auxiliary bishop of Sandomierz (1985–1992) and Radom (1992–2019).
Brent Renaud, 50, American photojournalist, writer (The New York Times), and filmmaker (Warrior Champions: From Baghdad to Beijing), shot.
Ľubomír Roman, 77, Slovak actor (St. Peter's Umbrella, The Sun in a Net, Soul at Peace) and politician, member of the National Council (1994–1998), minister of culture (1994).
Aliaksiej Skoblia, 31, Belarusian soldier (Armed Forces of Ukraine).
Tang Chuan, 69, Taiwanese actor (All in 700, Let's Go Crazy on LIVE!, Gold Leaf) and television producer.
Stephen Tarabalka, 29, Ukrainian fighter pilot (Ghost of Kyiv), shot down.
Sandra Warner, 87, American actress (Mr. Smith Goes to Washington, Some Like It Hot, Ask Any Girl) and model.

14
Brigitte Chamarande, 66, French actress (Subway, L'Étudiante, Betty), bone cancer.
Martin Parfait Aimé Coussoud-Mavoungou, 62, Congolese businessman and politician, complications from liver surgery.
Michael Cudahy, 97, American entrepreneur and philanthropist.
Terry Dunleavy, 93, New Zealand winemaker.
Jason Edwards, 52, Australian rugby league player (Newcastle Knights).
Jack R. Gannon, 85, American author and deaf culture historian.
Charles Greene, 76, American sprinter, Olympic champion (1968).
Scott Hall, 63, American Hall of Fame professional wrestler (WWF, WCW, TNA), complications from hip surgery.
Dave Hill, 81, American football player (Kansas City Chiefs).
Sharif Ali bin al-Hussein, 65, Iraqi royal and politician.
Kenichi Itō, 84, Japanese diplomat and political scientist, pneumonia.
Kumudben Joshi, 88, Indian politician, MP (1973–1985), governor of Andhra Pradesh (1985–1990).
Anil Joshiyara, 68, Indian politician, Gujarat MLA (since 1995), complications from COVID-19.
Mykola Kravchenko, 38, Ukrainian politician and soldier.
Eileen Mackevich, 82, American historian.
Jorge Silva Melo, 73, Portuguese theatre director and playwright, co-founder of Teatro da Cornucópia.
Eric Mercury, 77, Canadian singer, songwriter and musician.
Marilyn Miglin, 83, Czechoslovakian-born American entrepreneur, inventor and television host (Home Shopping Network).
Bill Miller, 92, American politician, member of the North Carolina Senate (2006–2007), complications from pneumonia.
Sandeep Nangal Ambian, 38, British-Indian kabaddi player (national team), shot.
Peter Padfield, 89, Indian-born British naval historian and author.
José Ramiro Pellecer Samayoa, 92, Guatemalan Roman Catholic prelate, auxiliary bishop of Guatemala (1967–2010).
Michael F. Price, 70, American value investor and philanthropist.
Azizur Rahman, 82, Bangladeshi film director (Ashikkhito, Chhutir Ghonta).
Morten Schakenda, 55, Norwegian baker, lung cancer.
Francisco Solís Peón, 53, Mexican politician, Mexico City MLA (2000–2003), complications from COVID-19.
Pervis Spann, 89, American broadcaster, music promoter and radio personality (WVON).
David Stephenson, 63, English rugby player (Salford, Wigan Warriors, national team).
Mina Swaminathan, 88, Indian educationist.
Akira Takarada, 87, Japanese actor (Godzilla, Life of an Expert Swordsman, A-Ge-Man: Tales of a Golden Geisha).
Steve Wilhite, 74, American computer scientist, inventor of the GIF, COVID-19.
Pierre Zakrzewski, 55, Irish war photojournalist (Fox News), incoming fire during the battle of Kyiv.

15
Cabo Anselmo, 80, Brazilian navy officer and informant, leader of 1964 Sailors' Revolt.
Tom Barnett, 85, English footballer (Romford, Crystal Palace, St Albans City).
Arturo Bonín, 78, Argentine actor (Asesinato en el Senado de la Nación).
Arnold W. Braswell, 96, American air force lieutenant general.
Piet Bukman, 88, Dutch politician, minister of defence (1988) and agriculture (1990–1994), Speaker of the House of Representatives (1994–1998).
Lauro Cavazos, 95, American politician, secretary of education (1988–1990).
Jean-Pierre Corteggiani, 79, French Egyptologist (The Pyramids of Giza: Facts, Legends and Mysteries).
C. William Gear, 87, British-American mathematician.
Dennis González, 67, American jazz trumpeter.
Mohammad Alavi Gorgani, 81–82, Iraqi-born Iranian grand ayatollah.
Marrio Grier, 50, American football player (New England Patriots).
Barbara Maier Gustern, 87, American vocal coach, brain injuries.
Til Hazel, 91, American real estate developer.
Jürgen W. Heike, 73, German politician, member of the Landtag of Bavaria (1994–2018).
Randy J. Holland, 75, American judge, member of the Delaware Supreme Court (1986–2017).
Joan Langdon, 99, Canadian Olympic swimmer (1936).
Lu Liang-Huan, 85, Taiwanese golfer.
Ma Shaoxin, 86, Chinese actor (Decisive Engagement: The Liaoxi-Shenyang Campaign).
Tony Marchi, 89, English football player (Tottenham Hotspur, Vicenza) and manager (Northampton Town).
Oleg Mityaev, 48, Russian major general, killed in action.
Norpipah Abdol, 67, Malaysian politician, Malacca State MLA (2008–2018), complications from cancer and COVID-19.
Nina Novak, 94, Polish-born Venezuelan ballerina and choreographer.
Patrick Osakwe, 73, Nigerian politician, senator (1999–2011).
Eugene Parker, 94, American solar physicist (Parker Solar Probe).
Jean Potvin, 72, Canadian ice hockey player (New York Islanders, Philadelphia Flyers, Minnesota North Stars) and radio broadcaster, Stanley Cup champion (1980, 1981).
Anneli Sauli, 89, Finnish actress (Miriam, Doctor Sibelius, The Man Without a Past).
David Stephenson, 63, British rugby league player (Salford Red Devils, Wigan Warriors, Leeds Rhinos).
Bob Williams, 80, American politician, member of the Washington House of Representatives (1979–1983, 1983–1989).

16
Denis Baylor, 82, American neurobiologist, cardiac arrhythmia.
Egidius Braun, 97, German football administrator, president of the DFB (1992–2001).
Chen Jingxiong, 100, Chinese engineer, member of the Chinese Academy of Engineering.
William Conan Davis, 95, American physical chemist.
Merri Dee, 85, American journalist (WGN-TV).
Vic Fazio, 79, American politician, chair of the House Democratic Caucus (1995–1999), member of the U.S. House of Representatives (1979–1999), melanoma.
Andy Geddes, 62, Scottish footballer (Dundee), cancer.
Syed Makbul Hossain, 75, Bangladeshi politician, MP (1986–1988, 2001–2006).
Dzintars Jaundžeikars, 66, Latvian politician, minister of the interior (2005–2006) and MP (2002–2010).
Dick Knostman, 90, American basketball player (Syracuse Nationals).
Shankarrao Genuji Kolhe, 92, Indian politician, Maharashtra MLA (1972–1984, 1990–2004).
Natta Konysheva, 86, Russian painter.
Richard Lipez, 83, American journalist and author, pancreatic cancer.
Graham McColl, 87, Australian footballer (Carlton).
Margaret M. McGowan, 90, British historian.
Mish Michaels, 53, Indian-born American meteorologist (WHDH, The Weather Channel).
Alton Morgan, 89, American politician, member of the Maine House of Representatives (1997–1999).
Barbara Morrison, 72, American jazz singer.
Pierce Mullen, 88, American historian.
Phillis Nolan, 76, Irish lawn bowler, world champion (1988, 1992, 1996).
Pierre Pichette, 68, Canadian sledge hockey player, Paralympic silver medalist (1998).
Józef Różański, 90, Polish politician, MP (1976–1985).
Slobodan Škrbić, 77, Serbian footballer (Red Star Belgrade, Lille OSC, Yugoslavia national team).
Kunimitsu Takahashi, 82, Japanese racing driver, motorcyclist, and team owner, four-time All-Japan Sports Prototype champion, lymphoma.
Ralph Terry, 86, American baseball player (New York Yankees, Kansas City Athletics, New York Mets). World Series champion (1961, 1962), complications from head injury.
Helene Vannari, 73, Estonian actress (Rahu tänav, All My Lenins, Mindless).
Pete Ward, 84, Canadian-born American baseball player (Chicago White Sox, New York Yankees, Baltimore Orioles).
Bobby Weinstein, 82, American songwriter ("Goin' Out of My Head", "It's Gonna Take a Miracle", "I'm on the Outside (Looking In)").

17
Christopher Alexander, 85, Austrian-born British-American architect and design theorist.
Pascal Beaudet, 65, French politician, member of the Departmental Council of Seine-Saint-Denis (2015–2021), mayor of Aubervilliers (2003–2008, 2014–2016).
Ingeborg Botnen, 88, Norwegian politician, MP (1981–1993).
Peter Bowles, 85, English actor (Rumpole of the Bailey, To the Manor Born, The Bounder), cancer.
Emmett C. Burns Jr., 81, American politician, member of the Maryland House of Delegates (1995–2015).
Clemens Cornielje, 63, Dutch politician, MP (1994–2005), King's commissioner of Gelderland (2005–2019), brain tumor.
Artem Datsyshyn, 43, Ukrainian ballet dancer, missile attack.
Jean-Pierre Demailly, 64, French mathematician.
Domenico DeMarco, 85, Italian pizzaiolo, founder of Di Fara Pizza.
Piotr Drzewiecki, 71, Polish footballer (Ruch Chorzów, national team).
Vaughn Flora, 77, American politician, member of the Kansas House of Representatives (1995–2008), cancer.
Sir Wira Gardiner, 78, New Zealand soldier, public servant and writer.
Dru C. Gladney, 65, American anthropologist.
Jaroslav Kurzweil, 95, Czech mathematician.
Edward Harding MacBurney, 94, American Anglican prelate, bishop of Quincy (1988–1994).
Bobby Nalzaro, 58, Filipino journalist and radio presenter (DYSS).
Tony Nash, 85, British bobsledder, Olympic champion (1964).
Gerrit Noordzij, 90, Dutch typographer.
Martha Palafox Gutiérrez, 73, Mexican politician, deputy (1997–2000, 2003–2006) and senator (2012–2018).
Elsa Papadimitriou, 80, Greek politician, MP (1993–2011).
Alan Rees, 84, Welsh rugby player (national team) and cricketer (Glamorgan).
Jean-Luc Ribar, 57, French footballer (Saint-Étienne, Stade Rennais).
Tadao Sato, 91, Japanese film critic, theorist and historian.
David Schmeidler, 82–83, Israeli mathematician and economic theorist.
Oksana Shvets, 67, Ukrainian actress, missile attack.
Hisanori Takada, 40, Japanese footballer (FF Lillehammer, Persitara, Pegasus).
Ramdeo Singh Yadav, 75, Indian politician, Bihar MLA (1980–1995), heart attack.
Yuri Vechkasov, 73, Russian politician, senator (1996–2001).

18
Harold Akin, 77, American football player (San Diego Chargers).
Aleksei Bakharev, 45, Russian-Ukrainian footballer (Lada-Tolyatti, Rotor Volgograd, Shakhtar Donetsk).
Tom Barrise, 68, American basketball coach (New Jersey Nets).
Antonio Castro Leache, 77, Spanish politician, member of the Valencian Courts (1987–1999).
Kelly Cherry, 81, American author and poet.
Erik Christensen, 90, American football player (Washington Redskins).
John Clayton, 67, American Hall of Fame sportswriter (The Pittsburgh Press, The News Tribune) and reporter (ESPN).
Ezio Damolin, 77, Italian Olympic skier (1964, 1968, 1972).
Bob Daniels, 86, American basketball coach (Kentucky Wesleyan Panthers).
Murray Day, 90, New Zealand squash administrator, president of the World Squash Federation (1975–1981).
Alfons Dirnberger, 80, Austrian footballer (national team).
John Arthur Eaves, 85, American politician, member of the Mississippi House of Representatives (1972–1976).
Jaap Flier, 88, Dutch dancer and choreographer.
Glen Glenn, 87, American rockabilly singer.
Lenard Gustafson, 88, Canadian politician, MP (1979–1993) and senator (1993–2008).
Eugene E. Habiger, 82, American general.
Oddrun Hokland, 79, Norwegian Olympic athlete (1964).
Chaim Kanievsky, 94, Polish-born Israeli Haredi rabbi.
Andy Lochhead, 81, Scottish footballer (Burnley, Aston Villa, Leicester City).
Alex MacLellan, 91, Canadian ice hockey player (Michigan Wolverines).
Bernabé Martí, 93, Spanish tenor.
Pepper Martin, 85, Canadian-American professional wrestler (NWA) and actor (Superman II, The Rockford Files).
George McCallum, 86, Scottish footballer (Third Lanark).
Nan Melville, 72, American photographer.
George Montague, 98, British LGBT rights activist.
Philippe Nassif, 50, French journalist and philosopher, suicide.
Younes Nazarian, 91, Iranian-American investor and philanthropist.
Robert Prentiss, 85, American politician, member of the New York State Assembly (1995–2005).
Borys Romanchenko, 96, Ukrainian Holocaust survivor, bombing.
Andrei Soluyanov, 62, Russian politician, deputy (1995–1999).
Åge Sørensen, 84, Norwegian footballer (Vålerenga, national team).
Budi Tek, 65, Indonesian art collector and philanthropist, pancreatic cancer.
Sheila Waters, 93, British calligrapher.
Grigory Yastrebenetsky, 98, Russian sculptor.
Don Young, 88, American politician, member of the U.S. House of Representatives (since 1973), Alaska Senate (1971–1973), and House of Representatives (1967–1971).

19
Shahabuddin Ahmed, 92, Bangladeshi jurist and politician, president (1990–1991, 1996–2001) and chief justice (1990–1995).
Federico Martín Aramburú, 42, Argentine rugby union player (US Dax, Glasgow Warriors, national team), shot.
Bill Archie, 92, American college football coach (Norfolk State).
Joseph Baber, 84, American composer and violist.
William C. Camp, 76, American politician, member of the New Mexico House of Representatives (1985–1989).
Pierre Carron, 89, French sculptor and painter.
Lyell Cresswell, 77, New Zealand composer, liver cancer complicated by COVID-19.
Tom Duffy, 92, Irish circus ringmaster.
Joel Hasse Ferreira, 77, Portuguese politician, MEP (2004–2009) and five-time deputy.
Linda Garrou, 79, American politician, member of the North Carolina Senate (1999–2013).
Pat Goss, 80, American mechanic and television presenter (MotorWeek).
Luis Guinot, 86, American diplomat.
Dilara Hashem, 85, Bangladeshi novelist.
He Luli, 87, Chinese politician and paediatrician, vice chairperson of the CPPCC (1996–1998) and Standing Committee of the NPC (1998–2008).
Alan Hopgood, 87, Australian actor (Bellbird, Prisoner, Neighbours), producer, and writer, prostate cancer.
Michail Jurowski, 76, Russian conductor (Nordwestdeutsche Philharmonie, Leipzig Opera).
Paul Kavanagh, Irish businessman and politician, senator (1989).
Roberts Ķīlis, 54, Latvian politician and social anthropologist, minister for education and science (2011–2013).
John Michael Małek, 93, Polish-American engineer.
Bill McLennan, 80, Australian statistician.
Scoey Mitchell, 92, American actor (Barefoot in the Park, Rhoda), comedian, and director.
Ku Pao-ming, 71, Taiwanese actor (Letter 1949, The Village of No Return, End of Summer) and comedian, heart failure.
Tom Moody, 60s, American visual artist, critic and blogger, complications from COVID-19.
Pierre Naftule, 61, Swiss writer and theatre director, complications from amytrophic lateral sclerosis.
Ansah Owusu, 42, English footballer (Raith Rovers, Bristol Rovers, Chelmsford City).
Bruce Rigsby, 84–85, American-Australian anthropologist.
Winfield W. Scott Jr., 94, American military officer, superintendent of the United States Air Force Academy (1983–1987).
Dave Sims, 52, English rugby union player (Gloucester, Exeter Chiefs, national team).
Mallu Swarajyam, 91, Indian politician, Andhra Pradesh MLA (1978–1987), multiple organ failure.
Marian Zembala, 72, Polish surgeon, academic and politician, deputy (2015–2019).

20
Abdullah Al-Nibari, 85, Kuwaiti politician, MP (1971–1976, 1992–1999).
Raimon Carrasco, 98, Spanish football executive, president of FC Barcelona (1977–1978).
Marina Goldovskaya, 80, Russian-American documentary film director, academic, and cinematographer.
Eric Hall, 89, British Olympic racewalker (1956, 1960).
Adriana Hoffmann, 82, Chilean botanist, environmentalist, and author.
Richard Labonté, 72, Canadian writer and editor, stomach cancer.
Miguel Navarro, 92, Spanish Olympic distance runner (1960).
Jacob Oulanyah, 56, Ugandan politician, speaker of the parliament (since 2021).
Andrei Paliy, 51, Russian military officer, killed in combat.
Brent Petrus, 46, American football player (New York Dragons), epilepsy.
Arnaldo Rosa Prata, 94, Brazilian politician, mayor of Uberaba (1971–1973).
John Purvis, 83, British politician, MEP (1979–1984, 1999–2009), cancer.
Ralph Riach, 86, Scottish actor (Hamish Macbeth, Chancer, Cloud Atlas).
John V. Roach, 83, American microcomputer pioneer, led development of the TRS-80.
Adam Shakoor, 74, American lawyer, jurist and activist.
Howard C. Tibbals, 85, American sculptor (The Howard Bros. Circus).
Gaétan Turcotte, 67, Canadian Olympic water polo player (1976).
Vijjota, 92, Burmese Buddhist monk, thathanabaing (since 2017).
Zaki Fatin Abdel Wahab, 61, Egyptian actor (The Sixth Day, Alexandria Again and Forever, Mercedes) and film director.
Wen Shengchang, 100, Chinese oceanographer and academic (Ocean University of China), member of the Chinese Academy of Sciences.
Reine Wisell, 80, Swedish racing driver.
Don Ylvisaker, 88, American mathematical statistician.
Tom Young, 89, American college basketball coach (Rutgers Scarlet Knights, Catholic University Cardinals, Old Dominion Monarchs).

21
Shinji Aoyama, 57, Japanese film director, screenwriter and composer (EM Embalming, Eureka, Tokyo Park), esophageal cancer.
Yuz Aleshkovsky, 92, Russian-American writer, poet, and singer-songwriter.
Waldemar Bergendahl, 88, Swedish film producer (My Life as a Dog, The Slingshot, Adam & Eva).
Samuel Cabrera, 61, Colombian road cyclist, lightning strike.
Yvan Colonna, 61, French Corsican nationalist and convicted murderer, complications from stab wounds.
Harold Curry, 89, American politician, member of the New Jersey General Assembly (1964–1968).
Lawrence Dane, 84, Canadian actor (Running, For the Record, Scanners), pancreatic cancer.
Rosa Gómez de Mejía, 82, Dominican socialite, first lady (2000–2004), heart attack.
Sara Suleri Goodyear, 68, Pakistani-American writer.
Kip Hawley, 68, American businessman and government official, administrator of the Transportation Security Administration (2005–2009), lung cancer.
Gérard Istace, 86, French politician, deputy (1981–1986, 1988–1993).
Lee Koppelman, 94, American urban planner.
William Randall Lolley, 90, American Christian clergyman.
Verne Long, 96, American politician, member of the Minnesota House of Representatives (1963–1974).
Soumeylou Boubèye Maïga, 67, Malian politician, prime minister (2017–2019) and minister of foreign affairs (2011–2012).
Vitaly Melnikov, 93, Russian film director (The Elder Son, Poor Poor Paul, The Admirer) and screenwriter.
Nikolai Osyanin, 80, Russian footballer (Krylia Sovetov Kuybyshev, Spartak Moscow, Soviet Union national team).
LaShun Pace, 60, American gospel singer, organ failure.
Mohammad Reyshahri, 75, Iranian politician and cleric, minister of intelligence (1984–1989), member of the Assembly of Experts (since 2016) and prosecutor-general (1991–1993).
Rodolfo Sacco, 98, Italian legal scholar.
Eva Ingeborg Scholz, 94, German actress (1-2-3 Corona, The Time with You, The Lost One).
Raymond Séguy, 92, French Roman Catholic prelate, bishop of Gap (1981–1987) and Autun (1987–2006).
Tallavajjala Sundaram, 71, Indian stage actor, director, and writer.
Fevzi Zemzem, 80, Turkish football player (Göztepe, national team) and manager.

22
Mohd Azizan Baba, 40, Malaysian football player (Kuala Lumpur, Sarawak) and manager (SAMB).
Eva Castillo, 52, Filipino singer, kidney disease.
Robert D. Cess, 89, American atmospheric scientist.
Terry Darracott, 71, English footballer (Everton, Tulsa Roughnecks, Wrexham).
Dame Miriam Dell, 97, New Zealand women's advocate.
Grindstone, 29, American racehorse, Kentucky Derby winner (1996).
Elspeth Howe, Baroness Howe of Idlicote, 90, British peer, member of the House of Lords (2001–2020), cancer.
Tadao Mitome, 83, Japanese photographer, prostate cancer.
Ted Mooney, 70, American novelist and journalist (Art in America), heart disease.
Pierre Papadiamandis, 85, French pianist and composer.
Barrington Patterson, 56, English kickboxer and mixed martial artist, heart attack.
Edmund Michał Piszcz, 92, Polish Roman Catholic prelate, archbishop of Warmia (1988–2006).
Jacques Rougerie, 90, French historian.
Sunanda Sanyal, 84, Indian academic, sepsis and multiple organ failure.
Thiounn Mumm, 96, Cambodian civil servant.
Milovan Vitezović, 77, Serbian writer, professor and screenwriter.
Elnardo Webster, 74, American basketball player (UG Gorizia, New York Nets, CB Cajabilbao).
Zipping, 20, Australian racehorse.

23
Amina Mohamed Abdi, 40, Somali politician, MP (since 2012), bombing.
Madeleine Albright, 84, Czechoslovakian-born American politician, secretary of state (1997–2001) and ambassador to the United Nations (1993–1997), cancer.
Auti Angel, 52, American actress (Musical Chairs), singer and dancer, breast cancer.
Spartak Borisov, 85, Russian politician, vice president of Sakha (1998–2002) and mayor of Yakutsk (1995–1997).
Charles G. Boyd, 83, American air force general, lung cancer.
Rusty Clark, 75, American football player (Edmonton Eskimos, BC Lions).
Sterling R. Cockrill, 96, American politician, member (1957–1970) and speaker (1967–1968) of the Arkansas House of Representatives.
Andrzej Cwojdziński, 94, Polish conductor, composer, and music teacher.
Hassan Dhuhul, Somali politician, MP (since 2012), bombing.
Boris Dorfman, 98, Romanian-born Ukrainian writer and scholar.
James Downey, 82, Canadian academic administrator, president of the University of New Brunswick (1980–1990) and the University of Waterloo (1993–1999).
Dermot Fitzpatrick, 81, Irish politician, TD (1987–1992, 2002–2007) and senator (1997–2002).
Guðrún Helgadóttir, 86, Icelandic children's author and politician, speaker of the Althing (1988–2001).
Kaneaster Hodges Jr., 83, American politician, senator (1977–1979).
Ivan Hollett, 81, English footballer (Chesterfield, Mansfield Town, Crewe Alexandra).
Zinaida Ignatyeva, 84, Russian pianist and music teacher.
Edward Johnson III, 91, American businessman (Fidelity Investments).
Russell Kerr, 92, New Zealand ballet dancer, choreographer, and producer.
Abd-Al-Minaam Khaleel, 100, Egyptian military officer.
Özcan Köksoy, 82, Turkish footballer (Fenerbahçe, Fatih Karagümrük, national team).
Ramesh Chandra Lahoti, 81, Indian jurist, chief justice (2004–2005).
Jimmy Lindley, 86, British jockey.
Som Marandi, 58, Indian politician, MP (1998–1999).
Busby Noble, 62, New Zealand Māori activist and Antarctic adventurer, cancer.
William Powell, 74, British barrister and politician, MP (1983–1997).
Rabindra Kumar Rana, 75, Indian politician, MP (2004–2009).
Arthur Riggs, 82, American geneticist, cancer.
Max Walsh, 84, Australian journalist.
Stan Wilson, 73, Australian cricketer (Western Australia, South Australia).
Zhang Ziyi, 97, Chinese zootechnician, member of the Chinese Academy of Engineering.

24
John Andrews, 88, Australian architect (Cameron Offices, CN Tower, Gund Hall).
Kirk Baptiste, 59, American sprinter, Olympic silver medalist (1984).
Dieter Bokeloh, 80, German Olympic ski jumper (1964).
Dagny Carlsson, 109, Swedish blogger and influencer.
Abhishek Chatterjee, 57, Indian actor (Dahan, Bariwali, Alo), heart attack.
Chen Chengda, 92, Chinese football player (Shanghai, national team) and manager.
Denise Coffey, 85, English actress (Waltz of the Toreadors, Georgy Girl, Sir Henry at Rawlinson End), comedian and writer.
Patricia Ann Ferguson, 86, Scottish civil engineer.
Johnny Fripp, 101, Canadian skier and football player (Ottawa Rough Riders).
Oleksandr Harbuz, 19, Ukrainian soldier, execution by gunshot. (death announced on this date)
Rafael Llopis, 88, Spanish psychiatrist, essayist, and translator.
Marty Martinello, 91, Canadian football player (Toronto Argonauts, Montreal Alouettes, Hamilton Tiger-Cats).
Kenny McFadden, 61, American-born New Zealand basketball player and coach (Wellington Saints), kidney disease.
John McLeod, 88, Scottish composer.
Richard A. Murphy, 77, American neuroscientist.
Arcadio Poveda, 91, Mexican astronomer.
Luis Roldán, 78, Spanish politician and convicted fraudster, director general of the Civil Guard (1986–1993).
G. Kendall Sharp, 87, American jurist, judge for the U.S. District Court for Middle Florida (since 1983).
Louie Simmons, 74, American powerlifter and strength coach.
Gil Stein, 94, American lawyer and ice hockey executive, president of the National Hockey League (1992–1993).
Ivan Yagan, 87, Russian writer.

25
Grace Alele-Williams, 89, Nigerian academic administrator, vice-chancellor of the University of Benin (1985–1992).
Birago Balzano, 86, Italian cartoonist (Zora).
Reza Baraheni, 86, Iranian novelist, poet, and political activist.
Thalekunnil Basheer, 77, Indian politician, MP (1977–1991).
Mira Calix, 52, South African-born British visual artist and musician.
Dr Cann, Ghanaian broadcaster (Happy FM).
Sir John Chapple, 90, British field marshal, commander-in-chief, land forces (1987–1988), chief of the general staff (1988–1992), and governor of Gibraltar (1993–1995).
Adebiyi Daramola, 64, Nigerian academic.
Ivan Dikunov, 80, Russian sculptor, complications from COVID-19.
Dirck Halstead, 85, American photojournalist (The Digital Journalist).
Taylor Hawkins, 50, American Hall of Fame musician (Foo Fighters, Taylor Hawkins and the Coattail Riders, The Birds of Satan).
Kathryn Hays, 87, American actress (Ride Beyond Vengeance, Counterpoint, As the World Turns).
Bobby Hendricks, 84, American singer (The Drifters), Alzheimer's disease.
Philip Jeck, 69, English composer.
Maksym Kagal, 30, Ukrainian kickboxer.
Milivoj Karakašević, 73, Serbian table tennis player.
Keith Martin, 55, American R&B singer, heart attack.
Nguyễn Hữu Việt, 33, Vietnamese Olympic swimmer (2004, 2008), asthma.
Alan Palmer, 95, British author.
Cat Pausé, 42, American fat studies academic and activist.
Yakov Rezantsev, 48, Russian general, air strike.
Va'ele Pa'ia'aua Iona Sekuini, 58, Samoan politician, MP (since 2021), heart attack.
Mxolisa Sokatsha, 57, South African politician, member of the National Assembly (since 2019), traffic collision.

26
Ba Dai, 91, Chinese politician, deputy (1964–1988).
Bang Jun-seok, 51, South Korean composer (Tell Me Something, Bloody Beach, Joint Security Area), music director, and singer-songwriter, stomach cancer.
Joseph Blenkinsopp, 94, American academic theologian.
Claudette Bradshaw, 72, Canadian politician, MP (1997–2006) and minister of labour (1998–2004), lung cancer.
James Butler, 90, British sculptor.
Bethany Campbell, 80, American writer.
Jeff Carson, 58, American country singer ("Not on Your Love", "The Car", "Holdin' Onto Somethin'"), heart attack.
Gianni Cavina, 81, Italian actor (The House with Laughing Windows, House of Pleasure for Women, Christmas Present).
Duan Qing, 68, Chinese philologist.
George Groombridge, 94, New Zealand politician.
Peter Gunby, 87, English football player (Bradford City) and manager (Leeds United, Harrogate Town).
Violetta Kolesnikova, 83, Russian animator (The Bremen Town Musicians, Winnie-the-Pooh, The Mystery of the Third Planet).
Theodore Kryzak, 66, American politician, member of the Maine House of Representatives (since 2018).
Garry Leach, 67, British comic book artist (Judge Dredd, Tharg's Future Shocks, Dan Dare).
Tina May, 60, English jazz singer, cancer.
John K. Menzies, 74, American diplomat, blood clot.
Aimé Mignot, 89, French football player (Lyon) and manager (Angers, Alès), peritonitis.
James Moriarty, 85, Irish Roman Catholic prelate, auxiliary bishop of Dublin (1991–2002) and bishop of Kildare and Leighlin (2002–2010).
Rosalind Morris, 101, Welsh-born American plant geneticist.
Tom Reynolds, 85, Australian politician, Victorian MLA (1979–1999).
Mike Riddell, 69, New Zealand Christian minister and writer.
Joe Williams, 88, American college basketball coach (Florida State Seminoles, Furman Paladins, Jacksonville Dolphins), cancer.
Teofil Wilski, 86, Polish Roman Catholic prelate, auxiliary bishop of Kalisz (1995–2011).

27
Lars Bloch, 83, Danish-Italian actor (A Stranger in Town, The Virgo, the Taurus and the Capricorn, Fracchia contro Dracula).
Titus Buberník, 88, Slovak footballer (ČH Bratislava, LASK Linz, Czechoslovakia national team).
Garret Cowenhoven, 80, American politician, member of the New Hampshire House of Representatives (1987–1995).
Jaroslav Falta, 71, Czech motocross racer, heart failure.
Shakir Hasanov, 74, Azerbaijani engineer and politician.
Ashton Hawkins, 84, American lawyer and museum board member (Metropolitan Museum of Art, Dia Art Foundation).
Joan Joyce, 81, American Hall of Fame softball player (Raybestos Brakettes) and coach (Florida Atlantic Owls), and golfer (LPGA Tour).
Karl Korte, 93, American composer.
Rocky King, 64, American professional wrestler and referee (WCW).
John LaGrone, 77, American football player (Edmonton Eskimos).
Maurice Langdon, 87, New Zealand cricketer (Northern Districts).
Lyubomir Milchev-Dandy, 58, Bulgarian journalist, writer, and television personality, beaten.
Ayaz Mutallibov, 83, Azerbaijani politician, prime minister (1989–1990) and president (1990–1992).
Valora Noland, 80, American actress (Beach Party, The Passionate Strangers, The War Wagon).
Enrique Pinti, 82, Argentine actor (Sentimental, Tango, Angel Face) and comedian, complications from diabetes.
Martin Pope, 103, American physical chemist.
Oleksandr Rzhavskyy, 63, Ukrainian politician.
Andur Sahadevan, 70, Indian journalist and film critic.
Ripunath Seth, 63, Indian politician, Odisha MLA (1995–2000).
James Vaupel, 76, American scientist.
Alexandra Zabelina, 85, Russian fencer, Olympic champion (1960, 1968, 1972).

28
Georges Bou-Jaoudé, 78, Lebanese Maronite Catholic hierarch, archbishop of Tripoli (2005–2020).
Marvin J. Chomsky, 92, American television director (Roots, The Wild Wild West, Star Trek).
Raja Izuddin Chulan, 71, Malaysian royal.
Marion Créhange, 84, French computer scientist.
Doris Derby, 82, American civil rights activist and photographer, cancer.
Anita Doherty, 73, Bahamian athlete, educator and philanthropist.
Naci Erdem, 91, Turkish footballer (Fenerbahçe, Galatasaray, national team) and coach.
B. B. Gurung, 92, Indian politician, chief minister of Sikkim (1984).
Dame June Jackson, 82, New Zealand Māori activist and public servant, member of the Parole Board (since 1991).
Lee Kelly, 89, American sculptor.
Serhiy Kot, 63, Ukrainian historian.
Eugene Melnyk, 62, Canadian businessman and philanthropist, owner of the Ottawa Senators (since 2003) and founder of Biovail.
Richard Moore, 49, Scottish journalist and racing cyclist.
Antonios Naguib, 87, Egyptian Coptic Catholic cardinal, patriarch of Alexandria (2006–2013).
Raquel Pankowsky, 69, Mexican actress (My Mexican Shivah, No eres tú, soy yo).
Helmer Strømbo, 73, Norwegian curler, European champion (1975).
Mircea Tomuș, 88, Romanian writer and literary historian.
David Vikøren, 95, Norwegian shipping executive, chief executive of the Norwegian Shipowners' Association (1977–1991).
Kenneth Walters, 87–88, British mathematician and rheologist.
Susan Welch, 78, American political scientist.
Barrie Youngfellow, 75, American actress (It's a Living).

29
June Shagaloff Alexander, 93, American civil rights activist.
Paul Benioff, 91, American physicist.
Harry Beverley, 74, English rugby league player (Workington Town, Fulham RLFC, national team).
Melanie Clark Pullen, 46, Irish actress (EastEnders) and film producer, breast cancer.
Joyce Fairbairn, 82, Canadian politician, senator (1984–2013).
Godfrey Fowler, 90, British physician and academic,  Professor of General Practice at the University of Oxford (1996–1997).
William G. Hamilton, 90, American physician.
Paul Herman, 76, American actor (The Sopranos, Crazy Heart, The Irishman).
Charles Jeffrey, 87, British-Russian botanist.
Irini Konitopoulou-Legaki, 90, Greek singer.
John Lear, 79, American conspiracy theorist and pilot. 
Jun Lopito, 64, Filipino rock guitarist.
Peter McDonald, 98, Irish Olympic footballer (1948).
Nancy Milford, 84, American biographer.
John T. Richardson, 98, American academic and priest, president of DePaul University (1981–1993).
Rüdiger, Margrave of Meissen, 68, German prince, disputed head of the Royal House of Saxony (since 2012).
Zigmunds Skujiņš, 95, Latvian writer.
Thomas F. Staley, 86, American author and scholar.
Miguel Van Damme, 28, Belgian footballer (Cercle Brugge), leukaemia.
Terry Wallis, 57, American extended coma recoverer.
Andy Wickham, 74, British record producer.
Jennifer Wilson, 89, British actress (The Brothers, Coronation Street).
Kerry-Jayne Wilson, 72, New Zealand biologist.
Alan Wooler, 68, English football player (Aldershot, FinnPa, Boston Minutemen) and manager.

30
Charles G. Anderson, 92, American police officer and politician, chief of the Anchorage Police Department (1974–1980), member of the Alaska House of Representatives (1981–1983).
James Bedingfield, 97, American politician, member of the Oregon House of Representatives (1965–1969).
Bob Brown, 88, Australian politician, MP (1980–1998), minister for land transport (1988–1993).
Andrzej Butra, 60, Polish veterinarian and politician.
Juan Carlos Cárdenas, 76, Argentine footballer (Racing Club, Veracruz, national team).
Ernie Carroll, 92, Australian puppeteer (Hey Hey It's Saturday, The Daryl and Ossie Show).
Dolores Castro, 98, Mexican poet, essayist and literary critic.
Mathew Cheriankunnel, 91, Indian Roman Catholic prelate, bishop of Nalgonda (1976–1986) and Kurnool (1988–1991).
Sir John Craven, 81, English businessman.
Yanick Étienne, 64, Haitian singer, cancer.
Egon Franke, 86, Polish fencer, Olympic champion (1964).
Abdelilah Mohammed Hassan, 88, Iraqi football manager (Al-Quwa Al-Jawiya, Al-Talaba, national team).
Martin Hochertz, 53, American football player (Washington Redskins, Miami Dolphins).
Thomas Huffman, 77, American archaeologist.
David Irvine, 75, Australian diplomat, director general of ASIO (2009–2014) and of ASIS (2003–2009).
Stephen Keener, 79, American voice actor (The Transformers).
Roger Laouenan, 89, French writer and historian.
Fred Markus, 84, Canadian Olympic cyclist (1956).
Manabu Miyazaki, 76, Japanese writer and social critic.
Wolf Muser, 75, German actor (Santa Barbara, Alias, The Man in the High Castle).
Abdul Kahar Othman, 68, Singaporean drug trafficker, execution by hanging.
Tom Parker, 33, English pop singer (The Wanted), glioblastoma.
John Peake, 97, British field hockey player, Olympic silver medallist (1948).
Bill Sylvester, 93, American football player (Butler Bulldogs).
Sidney Topol, 97, American businessman.
Willy Vanden Berghen, 82, Belgian racing cyclist, Olympic bronze medallist (1960).
Nathaniel Ian Wynter, 67, Jamaican musician (Bob Marley and the Wailers), cancer.
John Zaritsky, 79, Canadian filmmaker (Right to Die?, Just Another Missing Kid, Romeo and Juliet in Sarajevo), Oscar winner (1982).
Urbano Zea, 80, Mexican Olympic basketball player (1960).

31
Georgi Atanasov, 88, Bulgarian politician, prime minister (1986–1990).
Kirori Singh Bainsla, 81, Indian military officer and social activist.
Jennifer Belcher, 78, American politician, member of the Washington House of Representatives (1983–1993).
Vladimir Bochkov, 75, Russian politician, senator (2013–2018).
Rıdvan Bolatlı, 93, Turkish footballer (1952 Olympic team, Ankaragücü, national team).
John Bruhin, 57, American football player (Tampa Bay Buccaneers).
Andrzej Bujakiewicz, 82, Polish conductor and teacher.
Shirley Burkovich, 89, American baseball player (Chicago Colleens, Springfield Sallies, Rockford Peaches).
Günter Deckert, 82, German political activist.
Patrick Demarchelier, 78, French fashion photographer.
Joanne G. Emmons, 88, American politician, member of the Michigan Senate (1991–2002) and House of Representatives (1987–1990).
Zoltán Friedmanszky, 87, Hungarian football player (Ferencváros) and manager (Matanzas).
Ángel María Gianola, 95, Uruguayan politician, minister of industry and labour (1960–1963) and the interior (1994–1995).
Easa Saleh Al Gurg, Emirati businessman and diplomat, chairman at Easa Saleh Al Gurg Group.
Richard Howard, 92, American poet, Pulitzer Prize winner (1970).
Moana Jackson, 76, New Zealand Māori lawyer and academic.
Joseph Kalichstein, 76, American classical pianist, pancreatic cancer.
Patricia MacLachlan, 84, American author (Sarah, Plain and Tall, Skylark).
Franz M. Matschinsky, 90, German-American physician, pharmacologist and biochemist.
Sven Melander, 74, Swedish journalist (Aftonbladet), television personality (Snacka om nyheter), and actor (Sällskapsresan), esophageal cancer.
Tullio Moneta, 84, Italian mercenary, co-leader of the 1981 Seychelles coup d'état attempt.
Oon Chiew Seng, 106, Singaporean gynaecologist.
Francesc Pardo i Artigas, 75, Spanish Roman Catholic prelate, bishop of Girona (since 2008).
Marek Pasionek, 61, Polish lawyer and government official.
Patricia Poblete, 75, Chilean economist, minister of housing and urbanism (2006–2010).
Athauda Seneviratne, 90, Sri Lankan politician, MP (1970–1977, 1989–2015).
Niculae Spiroiu, 85, Romanian engineer, military general and politician, minister of defense (1991–1994).
Bob Todd, 72, English footballer (Wigan Athletic, Workington, Scarborough).
Oleksiy Tsybko, 55, Ukrainian rugby player (national team) and politician, mayor of Smila (2015–2018).
Vasyl Turyanchyk, 86, Ukrainian football player (Dynamo Kyiv, SKVO Lvov) and manager (Karpaty Mukacheve).
Kei Yamamoto, 81, Japanese actor (The Bullet Train, SP, Hachiko Monogatari), pneumonia.

References

2022-3
3